Clara Baur (1835–1912) was a German-born music teacher and founder of the Cincinnati Conservatory of Music.

Biography
Clara Baur was born in Baden-Württemberg, Germany, on 10 December 1835. Her father was a Lutheran preacher. Her elder brother Theodore moved to Cincinnati and after a few years he was joined by his brother Emil. Baur went out to act as their housekeeper and also offered piano and voice lessons from the house. In 1867 she visited Stuttgart to see how their music education was structured. Baur intended to set up a school based on the European methods. She also visited Paris and studied there before she returned and opened her Conservatory of Music at the end of the year in a room rented from the School of Young Ladies run by Clara Nourse. She had four tutors including her own voice coach, a cellist and a pianist. Baur would arrange accommodation for students from outside of the city. By the second year the school expanded to include the Violin, flute and theoretical instruction. The conservatory continued to grow and when Baur died in 1912 her niece Bertha took over. Eventually the school merged to become the Cincinnati College—Conservatory of Music in 1955 and became part of University of Cincinnati in 1962.

References

1835 births
1912 deaths
19th-century German educators
People from Cincinnati
German women educators
People from Baden-Württemberg
German emigrants to the United States